Kanal D is a television channel operated by Doğan Media International which showcases popular Turkish series.
Kanal D was launched in Turkey in September 1993, before launching in Germany on 1996. The channel now operates in a number of territories across Europe, Asia. Each of the individual channels broadcasts with a local schedule, advertising, dubbing and subtitling unique to each territory.

History
 Each of Kanal D broadcast around 18 hours of films each day, starting at 06:00 each day.
 channel launched in September 1993 before the channel launched in Turkey (September 1993), Germany (1996), Romania (February 2007), Thailand (2017), Poland (2017) and Italy (2017). 
 The channel may launch in Latin America, Africa and Middle East in the future as DMI have registered the domain.

External links
  Kanal D Turkey
  Kanal D Romania

Television in Turkey